The Division of Kooyong is an Australian Electoral Division for the Australian House of Representatives in the state of Victoria, which covers an area of approximately  in the inner-east suburbs of Melbourne. It is currently based on Kew, and also includes Balwyn, Canterbury, Deepdene, Hawthorn, Mont Albert and Mont Albert North; and parts of Camberwell, Glen Iris, Hawthorn East and Surrey Hills.

After the 2022 election, teal independent Monique Ryan became the member for the electorate, unseating former Liberal deputy leader and Treasurer Josh Frydenberg. It is the first time since Federation that the seat has not been held by the Liberals or their predecessors. Ryan is also the first woman to hold the seat, as well as the first member to unseat an incumbent in Kooyong since 1922.

Geography
Since 1984, federal electoral division boundaries in Australia have been determined at redistributions by a redistribution committee appointed by the Australian Electoral Commission. Redistributions occur for the boundaries of divisions in a particular state, and they occur every seven years, or sooner if a state's representation entitlement changes or when divisions of a state are malapportioned.

Demography
The 2021 Census found that 64.0% of Kooyong constituents were born in Australia with an additional 8.4% being born in China. 44.8% of people stated they weren't religious with the next most common responses being Catholic 19.6%, and then Anglican 7.9%.

History

The Division was proclaimed in 1900, and was one of the original 65 divisions to be contested at the first Federal election.

Kooyong has been held by the Liberal Party of Australia and its conservative predecessors for its entire existence, apart from 1921 to 1925, when John Latham successfully ran as a "Liberal", mainly on the platform of removing Billy Hughes as Prime Minister. With Hughes' resignation in 1923, Latham joined the governing Nationalist Party, and remained a member till his resignation from the seat and his elevation to the High Court. It is one of two original electorates in Victoria to have never been won by the Australian Labor Party, the other being Gippsland. For decades, it has been one of the safest Liberal-National coalition seats in metropolitan Australia. Even during Labor's landslide victory in 1943, Menzies won comfortably with 62.5 percent of the two-party-preferred vote.

The seat's best-known member was Sir Robert Menzies, the longest-serving Prime Minister of Australia. From 1922 to 1994, it was held by only three members, all of whom went on to lead the non-Labor forces in Parliament – former Opposition Leader and future Chief Justice John Latham, Menzies, and former Opposition Leader Andrew Peacock.

Peacock's successor, high-profile Liberal backbencher Petro Georgiou, saw off a challenge from Josh Frydenberg for Liberal Party preselection in April 2006. On 22 November 2008, Georgiou announced his retirement at the next federal election. Frydenberg won preselection as the Liberal Party's candidate for the seat for the 2010 election and won, despite a small swing against him.

In 2019, high-profile Greens candidate Julian Burnside received the highest two-party preferred vote against the Liberals or their predecessors in 90 years, at 44.3%. The Liberals had anticipated a strong contest and doubled their campaign funding to Kooyong earlier in the year, from $500,000 to $1 million. Frydenberg retained the seat, despite suffering a significant negative swing of 8.81% and the Liberal Party receiving its lowest first preference vote in the electorate in 76 years. It was also only the second time in 76 years that the major non-Labor party did not win the seat outright on the first count. The swing was actually large enough to drop the Liberal margin in a "traditional" two-party contest with Labor to 6.8 percent, the closest margin between the parties in decades. Although the Liberal Party won in the majority of booths, the Greens had the highest primary vote in three booths (Melbourne, Glenferrie and Glenferrie Central) and won in two-party preferred terms in 10 of the booths.

Name
The Division is named after the suburb of Kooyong, on which it was originally based. However, the suburb of Kooyong has not been in its namesake electorate for some time, being instead in neighbouring Higgins. Nonetheless, the seat has retained the name of Kooyong, primarily because the Australian Electoral Commission's guidelines on electoral redistributions require it to preserve the names of original electorates where possible.

Members

Election results

References

External links
 Division of Kooyong - Australian Electoral Commission

Electoral divisions of Australia
Constituencies established in 1901
1901 establishments in Australia
City of Boroondara
City of Whitehorse
Electoral districts and divisions of Greater Melbourne